Oak Ridge, Pittsylvania County is an unincorporated community in Pittsylvania County, Virginia. It is known as the location of the holiday home of former British prime minister Gordon Brown.

References

Unincorporated communities in Virginia
Unincorporated communities in Pittsylvania County, Virginia